Sports Entertainment Network (SEN), formerly Crocmedia, is an Australian radio and television distribution company established in 2006 by journalists James Swanwick and Craig Hutchison. SEN's parent company is Sports Entertainment Group (SEG), formerly Pacific Star Network.

SEN owns broadcast rights to AFL, A-League Men and A-League Women matches and Socceroos and Matildas home games. In 2016, it signed a $10 million six-year deal with the AFL for the national radio broadcasting rights for all AFL games.

History
Sports Entertainment Network was formed in 2006 as Crocmedia in the United States as a public relations company selling entertainment and news content. Now focusing on sports, the company produces content relating to AFL, soccer, rugby league, golf and racing which is broadcast on hundreds of radio stations across Australia.

Crocmedia entered the mainstream in late 2009 when it was announced that it would operate a live AFL radio service that would be syndicated throughout regional areas. Many regional broadcasters, including Ace Radio stations, 3BA, 3NE and Edge FM, replaced their existing feed – typically 3AW or Triple M – with the new Crocmedia feed. Crocmedia achieved further publicity by signing veteran broadcasters Sandy Roberts and Rex Hunt to provide commentary.

Crocmedia generated controversy in Albury-Wodonga in 2010 when 2AY announced that it would replace the popular 3AW program Sports Today with Sportsday. In November 2016, Crocmedia announced program partnership agreements with a number of radio broadcasters, which saw the merger of the metro Sports Today and regional Sportsday programs. From January 2017, Sportsday, with Sports Today hosts Gerard Healy and Dwayne Russell, aired weeknights on 3AW and across regional Victoria and Tasmania. Sportsday later expanded across the country.

Crocmedia received attention in January 2015, after the Federal Circuit Court fined the company $24,000 for breaching the minimum wage conditions of two employees. Judge Riethmuller branded Crocmedia's actions as 'exploitative'.

In January 2018, Pacific Star Network, the owner of SEN radio, confirmed it had acquired 100 per cent of equity in Crocmedia. Under the plan, existing Crocmedia CEO Craig Hutchison became the largest shareholder and CEO of the merged company.

In July 2019, Crocmedia purchased 23 narrowband radio licences across Australia including Sydney, Brisbane, Perth, Gold Coast, Darwin and Alice Springs.

In October 2020, Crocmedia was rebranded Sports Entertainment Network, with the media and content business to share an acronym with its SEN radio stations.

In March 2021, Sports Entertainment Network announced that it would expand into New Zealand, and subsequently acquired TAB NZ's 30 AM and FM broadcast licences. SENZ launched on 19 July 2021. The New Zealand subsidiary purchased New Zealand National Basketball League (NZNBL) team the Otago Nuggets in November 2021.

In April 2022, SEN purchased Women's National Basketball League (WNBL) team the Bendigo Spirit. The following month, SEN purchased Brisbane radio station 4KQ from its previous owners HT&E.

Programmes

Radio
 AFL Nation (formerly AFL Live)
 102.5 The Edge Deniliquin
 2AY 1494AM Albury-Wodonga
 2BH 567AM Broken Hill
 2EC 765AM Batemans Bay
 SEN 1116AM Melbourne
 3BA 102.3FM Ballarat
 3CS 1134AM Colac
 3GG 531AM Warragul (No longer takes any football coverage on weekends)
 3HA 981AM Hamilton
 3NE 1566AM Wangaratta
 3SH 1332AM Swan Hill
 3WM 1089AM Horsham
 3YB 94.5FM Warrnambool
 5AU 1242AM Port Augusta
 5CC 765AM Port Lincoln
 5CS 1044AM Port Pirie
 5MU 1125AM Murray Bridge
 5RM 801AM Berri
 7AD 98.9FM Devonport
 7BU 100.9FM Burnie
 7SD 540AM Scottsdale
 7XS 92.1FM Queenstwown
 8HA 900AM Alice Springs
 89.3 LAFM Launceston
 Gold 1242AM Traralgon / 98.3 FM Bairnsdale, Victoria
 Gold Central Victoria 1071AM Maryborough / 98.3FM Bendigo, Victoria
 Mix 104.9FM Darwin
 Red FM Regional and Remote Western Australia
 A-League Radio (formerly A-League Live and Football Nation)
 Big Bash Nation
 Off The Bench
 Sportsday Queensland
 4AY 873AM Innisfail
 4CC 927AM Gladstone
 4HI 1143AM Emerald
 4LM 666AM Mount Isa
 4SB 1071AM Kingaroy
 4VL 918AM Charleville
 4ZR 1476AM Roma
 88.7 KIK-FM Mareeba
 Zinc 96.1FM Sunshine Coast
 Zinc 100.7FM Townsville
 Zinc 101.9FM Mackay
 Zinc 102.7FM Cairns
 Sportsday South Australia
 5AA 1395AM Adelaide
 5AU 1242AM Port Augusta
 5CC 765AM Port Lincoln
 5CS 1044AM Port Pirie
 5MU 1125AM Murray Bridge
 5RM 801AM Berri
 Sportsday Victoria
 2AY 1494AM Albury-Wodonga
 2BH 567AM Broken Hill
 3AW 693AM Melbourne
 3BA 102.3FM Ballarat
 3CS 1134AM Colac
 3HA 981AM Hamilton
 3SH 1332AM Swan Hill
 3WM 1089AM Horsham
 3YB 94.5FM Warrnambool
 7AD 98.9FM Devonport
 7BU 100.9FM Burnie
 7SD 540AM Scottsdale
 7XS 92.1FM Queenstown
 River 1467AM Mildura
 Gold 1242AM Traralgon / 98.3 FM Bairnsdale
 Gold Central Victoria 1071AM Maryborough / 98.3FM Bendigo, Victoria
 Sportsday Western Australia
 6PR 882AM Perth
 Spirit Radio Network 98.1FM Geraldton
 Spirit Radio Network 102.9FM Broome
 Spirit Radio Network 621AM Bunbury
 Spirit Radio Network 1026AM Port Hedland
 Spirit Radio Network 1260AM Karratha
 Spirit Radio Network Regional and Remote Western Australia
 Trade Radio
 afl.com.au

Television
 Footy WA
 Channel 9 Perth
 WIN Television Regional Western Australia
 Footy SA
 Channel 9 Adelaide
 WIN Television Regional South Australia
 Off The Bench TV (Victorian edition)
 Prime7 Regional Victoria
 Off The Bench TV (Western Australian edition)
 7mate Regional Western Australia
 Future Stars
 Nine Network
 WIN Television Regional Victoria

References

External links
 Crocmedia

Radio production companies
Television production companies of Australia